List of naval battles of the War of 1812.

Forces
 United States Navy
 United States Marine Corps
 Revenue-Marine
 Royal Navy
 Royal Marines
 Provincial Marine

List of Battles
 First Battle of Sackett's Harbor 19 July 1812
 USS Essex vs HMS Alert 13 August 1812
 USS Constitution vs HMS Guerriere 19 August 1812
 Capture of HMS Frolic 18 October 1812
 Action off Madeira 25 October 1812
 Action off Kingston 6 November 1812
 Action off Brazil 29 December 1812
 Action in the Demerara River 24 February 1813
 Battle of Rappahannock River 3 April 1813
 Battle of York 27 April 1813
 Battle of Fort George 25–27 May 1813
 Action off James Island 28 May 1813
 Second Battle of Sackett's Harbor  28–29 May 1813
 Battle of Boston Harbor 1 June 1813
 Action off Charles Island 14 July 1813
 Action off Bermuda 5 August 1813
 Action off the Niagara 10 August 1813
 Action off St. David's Head 14 August 1813
 Action off Pemaquid Point 5 September 1813
 Battle of Lake Erie 10 September 1813
 Action off the Geneses 11 September 1813
 "Burlington Races" 28 September 1813
 Battle of Valparaiso 28 March 1814
 Action in the Straits of Florida 20 April 1814
 Action off Cape Canaveral 28 April 1814
 Battle of Fort Oswego (1814) 6 May 1814
 Battle of Big Sandy Creek 29–30 May 1814
 Sinking of HMS Reindeer 28 June 1814
 Action at Nottawasaga 14 August 1814
 Sinking of HMS Avon 1 September 1814
 Capture of the Scorpion and Tigress 2–6 September 1814
 Battle of Plattsburgh 11 September 1814
 Battle of Baltimore 12–15 September 1814
 First Battle of Fort Bowyer 14–16 September 1814
 Battle of Fayal 26–27 September 1814
 Action off the Bay of St. Louis 13 December 1814
 Battle of Lake Borgne 14 December 1814
 Siege of Fort St. Philip (1815) 9–18 January 1815
 Battle of Fort Peter 13–14 January 1815
 Action off New York 15 January 1815
 Action in the Mid-Atlantic 20 February 1815
 Action off Tristan da Cunha 23 March 1815
 Capture of East India Company ship Nautilus 30 June 1815

Lists of battles by war